Gioia can refer to:

Given names
 Gioia Bruno
 Gioia Marconi Braga

Surnames
 Anthony H. Gioia
 Carl Daniel Gioia
 Dana Gioia
 Eric Gioia
 Flavio Gioia
  (1764 or 1768-1826) – Italian dancer and choreographer (Teatro di San Carlo and La Scala)
 John Gioia
 Kenny Gioia
 Melchiorre Gioia
 Raffaele Gioia (1757-1805) - Italian painter from San Massimo (Province of Campobasso)
 Ted Gioia

Toponyms
 Gioia del Colle
 Gioia dei Marsi
 Gioia (Milan Metro)
 Gioia Sannitica
 Gioia Tauro

Other
 Gioia (magazine), an Italian weekly women's fashion magazine published between 1937 and 2018

See also 

 Gioiosa (disambiguation)